Oconee is a village in Shelby County, Illinois, United States. The population was 777 at the 2010 census.

The village was named after the daughter of a local Native American chieftain.

Geography

Demographics

As of the census of 2000, there were 202 people, 78 households, and 64 families residing in the village. The racial makeup of the village was 100.00% White. Hispanic or Latino of any race were 1.49% of the population.

There were 78 households, out of which 46.2% had children under the age of 18 living with them, 71.8% were married couples living together, 2.6% had a female householder with no husband present, and 17.9% were non-families. 16.7% of all households were made up of individuals, and 11.5% had someone living alone who was 65 years of age or older. The average household size was 2.59 and the average family size was 2.89.

In the village, the population was spread out, with 26.2% under the age of 18, 11.4% from 18 to 24, 23.8% from 25 to 44, 18.3% from 45 to 64, and 20.3% who were 65 years of age or older. The median age was 36 years. For every 100 females, there were 92.4 males. For every 100 females age 18 and over, there were 98.7 males.

The median income for a household in the village was $38,750, and the median income for a family was $41,250. Males had a median income of $23,750 versus $15,313 for females. The per capita income for the village was $14,068. About 3.2% of families and 3.6% of the population were below the poverty line, including 4.4% of those under the age of eighteen and 5.2% of those 65 or over.

References

Villages in Shelby County, Illinois
Villages in Illinois